Dmitry Zavgorodniy (also spelt Dmitri; born 11 August 2000) is a Russian professional ice hockey centre who is currently playing with HC Sochi in the Kontinental Hockey League (KHL).

Playing career
Zavgorodniy was born on 11 August 2000 in Omsk, Russia. Following his single season with Omskie Yastreby in the MHL, Zavgorodny joined the Rimouski Océanic of the Quebec Major Junior Hockey League (QMJHL). During his draft season, Zavgorodniy was ranked 69th overall amongst all North American skaters by the NHL Central Scouting Bureau. He was eventually drafted 198th overall by the Calgary Flames in the 2018 NHL Entry Draft and signed a three-year entry-level contract after recording 28 goals and 36 assists for 64 points in 67 games during the 2018–19 regular season. In his final major junior season, Zavgorodniy was named a finalist for the Frank J. Selke Memorial Trophy as the league's most sportsmanlike player.

During the COVID-19 pandemic, Zavgorodniy was loaned to SKA Saint Petersburg in the Kontinental Hockey League. Upon returning to North America, Zavgorodniy joined the Flames' American Hockey League (AHL) affiliate, the Stockton Heat.

In the following  season, Zavgorodniy continued with the Heat, going scoreless in 6 games before he was loaned by the Flames back to the KHL in joining HC Sochi, on 6 December 2021. He made 10 appearances with Sochi in the remainder of the regular season, collecting 3 assists, before he returned to North America to re-join the Stockton Heat on 25 February 2022. While not featuring during the playoffs with the Heat, Zavgorodniy was placed on unconditional waivers by the Flames and subsequently mutually terminated the remaining year on his contract with the Flames on 28 May 2022.

On 12 June 2022, Zavgorodniy returned to Russia and rejoined KHL club, HC Sochi, in agreeing to a two-year contract.

Career statistics

Regular season and playoffs

International

References

External links

2000 births
Living people
Calgary Flames draft picks
Rimouski Océanic players
Russian ice hockey centres
Russian ice hockey people
SKA Saint Petersburg players
HC Sochi players
Stockton Heat players